WCDN-LD (WCDN-LP before 2008), virtual channel 53 (VHF digital channel 7), is a Daystar-owned-and-operated television station licensed to Cleveland, Ohio, United States. The station is owned by  Daystar Television Network

History

Founded on November 30, 1989, the station signed on the air on analog channel 53. Prior to its Daystar affiliation, WCDN carried ShopNBC.

In October 2009, WCDN flash cut to its digital signal on channel 7. WCDN is the first low-power TV station in the Cleveland market to convert to digital. WCDN briefly carried a simulcast of WXOX-LP on 53.2.

Digital channels
The station's digital signal is multiplexed:

References

External links 
Official site

CDN-LD
Daystar (TV network) affiliates
Television channels and stations established in 1989
Low-power television stations in the United States